Koimbani is a town located on the island of Grande Comore in the Comoros, believed to have been built by the Portuguese.

Populated places in Grande Comore